Sandy McDonald, also MacDonald or Macdonald, may refer to:

 Sandy McDonald (Alexander McDonald, 1937–2016), a Scottish minister
 Sandy MacDonald (Samuel Alexander MacDonald, 1904–2003), a Canadian competitive sailor
 Sandy Macdonald (John Alexander Lindsay Macdonald, born 1954), a former Australian politician

See also 
 Sandy (given name)
 Macdonald (for surnames Macdonald, MacDonald, and McDonald)